Sogn is a traditional district in Western Norway.

Sogn may also refer to:
 Sogn (parish), an administrative unit in Denmark
 Sogn, Minnesota, an unincorporated community in Warsaw Township, Goodhue County
 Sogn, Oslo, a former district of Oslo, Norway
 Sogn Fjord, Norway
 Sogn og Fjordane (newspaper), a former Norwegian newspaper, named Sogn 1932-1936
 Karen Sogn (1931-2013), Norwegian politician

See also
 Crap Sogn Gion, a mountain and cable car station in Switzerland
 Sogn Avis, a Norwegian newspaper
 Sogn District Court, a former court in Sogndalsfjøra, Norway
 Sogn og Fjordane, a former county in western Norway
 Sogn og Fjordane Art Museum, Førde, Norway
 Sogn og Fjordane County Municipality, Norway
 Sogn og Fjordane District Court, Førde, Norway
 Sogn og Fjordane Energi, a Norwegian power company
 Sogn og Fjordane Teater, a theatre in Førde, Norway
 Sogn og Fjordane University College, Norway
 Sogn Parcazi Castle and Church, Switzerland
 Sogn Studentby, a residential area for students in Oslo, Norway
 Sogn Upper Secondary School, a former school in Oslo, Norway
 Sogn-A-Song, a 1996 album by Karl Seglem
 Sogndal (disambiguation)
 Sogns Tidend, a former Norwegian newspaper